The name Caratacus may refer to:

Caratacus, a British king at the time of the Roman conquest.
Caratacus Burke, a character in the Harry Potter series.
Caratacus Pott or Caratacus Potts, the hero of Ian Fleming's Chitty Chitty Bang Bang.
"Caractacus" is a misspelling, or an old variant spelling.